Deya may refer to:

Deya (lamp), or diya, a type of lamp often used during Diwali
Deya (station), a rural locality in Preobrazhensky Selsoviet, Zavitinsky District, Amur Oblast, Russia
Avdey, a Russian male given name with the diminutive form Deya
Gilbert Deya, British evangelist and accused criminal extradited to Kenya

See also
Adugna Deyas (born 1983), Ethiopian association football player
Deià, a village on the Spanish island of Majorca